The Police Service Medal is a Norwegian civil decoration for long service in the Norwegian Police Service.

The medal is awarded after 25 years of service with the Norwegian Police Service. A star is awarded for each additional five years of service, up to a maximum of three stars, or 40 years of service.

The Police Service Medal is 41st in the Norwegian order of precedence.

See also 

 Orders, decorations, and medals of Norway
 Norwegian Police Service

References 

Orders, decorations, and medals of Norway
Law enforcement in Norway
2002 establishments in Norway